Littleton Purnell Dennis (July 21, 1786 – April 14, 1834) was an American politician.

Born at "Beverly" in Pocomoke City, Worcester County, Maryland, Dennis attended Washington Academy of Somerset County, Maryland, and graduated from Yale College in 1803.  He studied law,  was admitted to the bar, and commenced practice.  In 1815, 1816, and from 1819 to 1827, Dennis served as a member of the Maryland House of Delegates, and was a member of the executive council of Maryland in 1829.  He also served as an elector of the Maryland State Senate in 1831.  Dennis was elected as an Anti-Jacksonian to the Twenty-third Congress and served from March 4, 1833, until his death in Washington, D.C.  He is interred in the Congressional Cemetery.

Littleton Dennis was a nephew of John Dennis (1771–1806) and cousin of Littleton Dennis Jr. and John Dennis (1807–1859).

See also
List of United States Congress members who died in office (1790–1899)

References

1786 births
1834 deaths
Members of the Maryland House of Delegates
Yale College alumni
People from Pocomoke City, Maryland
Burials at the Congressional Cemetery
National Republican Party members of the United States House of Representatives from Maryland
19th-century American politicians